Prosapia bicincta, the two-lined spittlebug, is a species of insect in the family Cercopidae.
Adults are black with two red or orange lines crossing the wings. It reaches a length of 8–10 mm. It is widespread in the eastern half of the United States. A similar but possibly distinct species can be found throughout Central America where it is considered an agricultural pest.

Nymphs feed on various grasses (including centipedegrass, bermudagrass and corn) from within foam (consisting of their own spittle) produced from juices of their host plant. Adults feed on the leaves of both native and introduced species of holly, as well as on the leaves of the eastern redbud tree. It is a pest of forage grasses and turf grasses such as those grown for lawns and its consumption of these plants causes economic damage throughout the southeastern United States.

References 

Cercopidae
Hemiptera of North America
Insects described in 1830
Taxa named by Thomas Say